Christian Esezi Ide is an Anglican bishop in Nigeria.

Ide is the current Bishop of Warri. Ide was born on 21 September 21, 1959 in Benin City and educated at Immanuel College of Theology, Ibadan. He was ordained  in July 1997. He has served at Igbudu, Emevorand and Abuja.

He was elected Bishop of Warri during the Episcopal Synod on 28 June 2006, at All Saints Church, Wuse, Abuja.

Notes

Living people
1959 births
People from Benin City
University of Ibadan alumni
Anglican bishops of Benin
21st-century Anglican bishops in Nigeria
Anglican bishops of Warri